The following are the winners of the 7th annual ENnie Awards, held in 2007:

External links
 2007 ENnie Awards

 
ENnies winners